Glenn Melvin Cox (February 3, 1931 – January 7, 2012) was an American professional baseball player. The right-handed pitcher appeared in 17 games (with five starts) over parts of four seasons in Major League Baseball (1955–58) for the Kansas City Athletics.

Cox's pro career lasted from 1950 to 1951, and from 1954 to 59; he missed 1952–53 during the Korean War. In the Majors, Cox compiled a career record of 1–4, with his lone victory coming on July 13, 1957, in a 6–4 win over the defending world champion New York Yankees.  In that game, Cox relieved starting pitcher Arnie Portocarrero in the sixth inning with the Yanks leading 4–2. He threw 2 innings of one-hit, shutout relief as the A's came back to take the lead.  Cox exited the game in the eighth, and Tom Morgan nailed down the save for Kansas City.

In 43 big-league innings pitched, Cox surrendered 50 hits and 35 bases on balls. He struck out 17.

References

External links
, or Retrosheet

1931 births
2012 deaths
Baseball players from California
Billings Mustangs players
Buffalo Bisons (minor league) players
Columbus Jets players
Kansas City Athletics players
Major League Baseball pitchers
Mobile Bears players
Montreal Royals players
Portland Beavers players
Rapiños de Occidente players
Richmond Virginians (minor league) players
Sportspeople from Montebello, California